The Plauen tramway network is a network of tramways forming part of the public transport system in Plauen, a city in the federal state of Saxony, Germany.

Lines 
, the network had the following lines:

See also
List of town tramway systems in Germany
Trams in Germany

References

External links

 
 

Plauen
Plauen
Transport in Saxony
Metre gauge railways in Germany
600 V DC railway electrification
Plauen